Carl Andreas Dusinius Hjort Petersen (19 September 1901 – 15 February 1976) was a Danish boxer who competed in the 1924 Summer Olympics. He was born in Buddinge and died in Copenhagen. In 1924 he was eliminated in the second round of the welterweight class after losing his fight to the upcoming silver medalist Héctor Méndez.

References

External links
profile

1901 births
1976 deaths
Welterweight boxers
Olympic boxers of Denmark
Boxers at the 1924 Summer Olympics
Danish male boxers
People from Gladsaxe Municipality
Sportspeople from the Capital Region of Denmark